Jeff Lee (born October 2, 1981) is a former international freestyle swimmer from the United States. He won a gold medal at the 2003 Pan American Games with the US relay teams in the men's  freestyle. He was born and raised in Munster, Indiana and attended Munster High School.

References
Profile

1981 births
Living people
USC Trojans men's swimmers
Swimmers at the 2003 Pan American Games
People from Munster, Indiana
Swimmers from Indiana
Pan American Games gold medalists for the United States
Pan American Games medalists in swimming
Medalists at the 2003 Pan American Games